Père David's tit or the rusty-breasted tit (Poecile davidi) is a species of bird in the tit family Paridae. It is endemic to central China in southern Gansu, western Hubei, southern Shaanxi and Sichuan.

Its natural breeding habitat is subalpine forests at 2,135–3,400 m altitude, mostly resident but higher altitude birds descending a little in winter to below .

References 
Notes

Sources

Père David's tit
Birds of Central China
Endemic birds of China
Père David's tit
Taxonomy articles created by Polbot